Muqaddas is an Arabic word meaning "sanctified".

It may refer to:

Places
 Bayt al-Muqaddas, Arabic name and a common designation for Jerusalem in Islamic sources.
 Al-arḍ al-muqaddasa, the Holy Land.

Other
 Al-Jihad al-Muqaddas: a Palestinian Arab irregular force in the 1947-48 Palestinian civil war.
 Muqaddas (TV series)
 Jang e Muqaddas

See also
 Muqaddasi